5th Street station or Fifth Street station may refer to:
 5th Street station (Los Angeles), a Los Angeles Metro station
 Fifth Street station (Miami), a Miami Metromover station
 Fifth Street station (LIRR)
 5th Street/Independence Hall station, a SEPTA subway station in Philadelphia
 5th Street station (DC Streetcar), a light rail stop in Washington, D.C.

See also
5th Street (disambiguation)